, also Kamuinupuri or Mount Mashū, a potentially active volcano, is a parasitic stratovolcano of the Mashū caldera (itself originally a parasitic cone of Lake Kussharo) located in the Akan National Park of Hokkaido, Japan.

Volcanism

Mount Kamui rose on the rim of 6 km-wide Mashū caldera, about four thousand years ago, after the collapse of Mashū volcano. Its last eruption took place about 1000 years ago.

Tourism

Hikers can follow a 7.2 km wooded trail to the peak of the mountain, walking along the ridge of the caldera, which is a 300-m vertical drop to the surface of the Lake Mashū.

References

Mountains of Hokkaido
Volcanoes of Hokkaido
Stratovolcanoes of Japan
Potentially active volcanoes